David Růžička (born 8 March 1988) is a Czech professional ice hockey defenceman currently playing for Vlci Žilina of the Slovak 1. Liga.

He played with HC Kladno in the Czech Extraliga during the 2010–11 Czech Extraliga season.

Career statistics

Regular season and playoffs

International

References

External links

1988 births
Living people
HC Benátky nad Jizerou players
HC Berounští Medvědi players
Czech ice hockey defencemen
Sportovní Klub Kadaň players
Rytíři Kladno players
HC Košice players
Piráti Chomutov players
IHC Písek players
HC Shakhtyor Soligorsk players
HKM Zvolen players
HC 21 Prešov players
MsHK Žilina players
Expatriate ice hockey players in Belarus
Czech expatriate sportspeople in Belarus
Czech expatriate ice hockey players in Slovakia